The Ambassador of the United Kingdom to Belgium is the United Kingdom's foremost diplomatic representative in Belgium, and in charge of the UK's diplomatic mission in Belgium. The official title is His Britannic Majesty's Ambassador to the Kingdom of Belgium.

Heads of Missions

Envoys Extraordinary to the Sovereign Duchess of Netherlands (1598- 1621)
 1600–1601: Thomas Edmondes
 1605–1609: Thomas Edmondes
 1620: Sir Edward Conway

Envoys Extraordinary to the General Governor of the Spanish Netherlands
 1665: Sir William Temple, Bt.
 1671: Sir Robert Southwell Ambassador
 1689–1692: John Andrew Eckhart Resident
 1692–1696: Robert Wolseley
 1696–1699: Richard Hill Envoy Extraoridinary to all parts of Netherlands
 1699–1701: Mr Marmande Secretary

Envoys Extraordinary at Brussels
 1701–1706: Apparently no representation at Brussels
 1706–1707: George Stepney
 1707–1712: John Lawes in charge 1707–1708; then HM Secretary at Brussels
 1707–1711: Maj.-Gen. William Cadogan (also accredited at The Hague)

Envoys to the Imperial Court at Brussels
 1711–1713: The Earl of Orrery Envoy Extraordinary 1711–1712; Envoy Extraordinary and Plenipotentiary 1712–1713.
 1712–1715: John Lawes Acting Minister Plenipotentiary; then Secretary
 1714–1715: Lieut.-Gen. William Cadogan Envoy Extraordinary and Plenipotentiary
 1715–1724: William Lethes HM Secretary at Brussels 1715–1717; Resident c.1718–1724
 1722–1745: Robert Daniel in charge of affairs or Agent
 1742–1744: Onslow Burrish Secretary 1742–1744; Resident 1744 (residing mainly at Liege)
 1744–1752: No representation
 1752–1757: Solomon Dayrolles Minister
 1757–1763: Diplomatic Relations broken off due to Seven Years' War
 1763–1765: Sir James Porter FRS
 1765–1777: William Gordon
 1777–1783: Alleyne Fitzherbert
 1783–1792: George Byng, 4th Viscount Torrington
 1789–1792: Francis Wilson Chargé d'Affaires
 1792–1794: Thomas Bruce, 7th Earl of Elgin

The Austrian Netherlands were then conquered by France. After the Napoleonic War, they were part of the Netherlands, then briefly known as the United Kingdom of the Netherlands until the Belgian Revolution of 1830.

Envoy Extraordinary and Minister Plenipotentiary
 1830: John, Lord Ponsonby, special mission to Provisional Government
 1831–1835: Robert Adair, special mission
 1835–1836: Henry Lytton Bulwer, Chargé d'Affaires
 1836–1845: Sir George Hamilton Seymour
 1845–1846: Thomas Waller, Chargé d'Affaires
 1846–1868: Charles Ellis, 6th Baron Howard de Walden
 1868–1883: John Savile, 1st Baron Savile
 1883–1884: Sir Edward Baldwin Malet, 4th Baronet
 1884–1892: Hussey Vivian, 3rd Baron Vivian
 1892–1893: Sir Edmond Monson, K.C.M.G.
 1893–1900: Sir Francis Plunkett
 1900–1906: Sir Constantine Phipps
 1906–1911: Arthur Henry Hardinge
 1911–1919: Sir Francis Hyde Villiers

Ambassador Extraordinary and Plenipotentiary
 1919–1920: Sir Francis Hyde Villiers
 1920–1928: Sir George Grahame (and Minister to Luxembourg)
 1928–1933: Granville Leveson-Gower, 3rd Earl Granville (and Minister to Luxembourg)
 1933–1934: Sir George Clerk (and Minister to Luxembourg)
 1934–1937: Sir Esmond Ovey (and Minister to Luxembourg)
 1937–1939: Sir Robert Clive (and Minister to Luxembourg)
 1939–1944: Sir Lancelot Oliphant
 1944–1947: Sir Hughe Knatchbull-Hugessen
 1947–1950: Sir George Rendel
 1950–1951: Sir John Le Rougetel
 1951–1955: Sir Christopher Warner
 1955–1960: Sir George Labouchere
 1960–1963: Sir John Nicholls
 1963–1969: Sir Roderick Barclay
 1969–1974: Sir John Beith
 1974–1978: Sir David Muirhead
 1979–1981: Sir Peter Wakefield
 1982–1985: Sir Edward Jackson
 1985–1989: Sir Peter Petrie, 5th Baronet
 1989–1992: Robert O'Neill
 1992–1996: Sir John Gray
 1996–2001: David Colvin
 2001–2003: Gavin Hewitt
 2003–2007: Richard Kinchen
 2007–2010: Rachel Aron
 2010–2014: Jonathan Brenton
 2014–2019: Alison Rose

–present: Martin Shearman

See also
 Belgium–United Kingdom relations

References

External links
UK and Belgium, gov.uk

Belgium
 
United Kingdom